The 1963 Los Angeles Angels season involved the Angels finishing 9th in the American League with a record of 70 wins and 91 losses.

Offseason
 December 11, 1962: Earl Averill, Jr. was traded by the Angels to the Philadelphia Phillies for Jacke Davis.
 Prior to 1963 season: Art Fowler was signed as a free agent by the Angels.

Regular season

Season standings

Record vs. opponents

Notable transactions
 May 15, 1963: Bobby Darwin was selected off waivers from the Angels by the Baltimore Orioles as a first-year waiver pick.
 July 27, 1963: Jimmy Piersall was signed as a free agent by the Angels.
 September 20, 1963: Jimmy Piersall was released by the Angels.

Roster

Player stats

Batting

Starters by position
Note: Pos = Position; G = Games played; AB = At bats; H = Hits; Avg. = Batting average; HR = Home runs; RBI = Runs batted in

Other batters
Note: G = Games played; AB = At bats; H = Hits; Avg. = Batting average; HR = Home runs; RBI = Runs batted in

Pitching

Starting pitchers
Note: G = Games pitched; IP = Innings pitched; W = Wins; L = Losses; ERA = Earned run average; SO = Strikeouts

Other pitchers
Note: G = Games pitched; IP = Innings pitched; W = Wins; L = Losses; ERA = Earned run average; SO = Strikeouts

Relief pitchers
Note: G = Games pitched; W = Wins; L = Losses; SV = Saves; ERA = Earned run average; SO = Strikeouts

Farm system

Notes

References
1963 Los Angeles Angels team page at Baseball Reference
1963 Los Angeles Angels team page at www.baseball-almanac.com

Los Angeles Angels seasons
Los Angeles Angels season
Los